Okeme Eleojo (born 4 October 1992 in Sokoto) is a Nigerian professional football player who currently plays for Al-Karkh SC as a central defender.

External links
 http://www.arsenal.kharkov.ua/command.php?action=players

1992 births
Nigerian footballers
Association football central defenders
Curepipe Starlight SC players
Expatriate footballers in Iraq
Al-Karkh SC players
Living people
People from Sokoto